Boozer may refer to:

 Boozer, a person who drinks alcohol, especially one who drinks to excess
 Pub, in British slang
 Boozer (surname), a surname
 Boozer Pitts, (1893–1971), American football player and coach
 Boozer, in the List of World War II electronic warfare equipment